R. Bruce Lindsay may refer to:
 Robert Bruce Lindsay, American physicist
 R(ichard) Bruce Lindsay (broadcaster) (born 1950), American broadcast journalist